First Student is the largest provider of school bus services in North America. The company works with districts in thirty-eight states and seven Canadian provinces, carrying approximately five million students daily. In addition to its regular routes, First Student also provides special-needs transportation, field trip services, and charter bus rentals. 

With a workforce of 50,500 employees and a fleet of 44,050 vehicles, the company bus fleet drives over 550 million miles every year. Formerly a division of FirstGroup, First Student was sold to EQT Infrastructure on 21 July 2021.

History

Ryder Public Transportation acquisition
In 1999, Ryder sold its school bus division to FirstGroup for $940 million, in order to focus on its truck leasing and rental business.

Laidlaw acquisition
By 2007, FirstGroup had built the First Student network into one of the largest school bus contractors in the United States; in the same year, the company acquired Laidlaw for $3.4 billion, taking over its school transportation operations as well.

FirstGroup breakup

FirstGroup, the parent company of First Student, announced that it would consider a sale of its North American school bus and transit divisions in December 2019. The North American division was valued at $3.5 billion at the time of the announcement. In April 2021, FirstGroup agreed terms were to sell the business to EQT Partners. The deal closed on July 22, 2021.

Safety features
In 2010, First Student installed Zonar on all 60,000 of its school buses. These features include the EVIR Inspection System for verified pre-trip, post-trip and child-check inspections; the V2J Vehicle Diagnostic Device for tracking and managing of assets and real-time transmission of vehicle subsystem data; and Ground Traffic Control, a Web-based data and fleet management application.

First Student Canada
First Student Canada is a major contractor of school bus services and public transit systems. The company provides services in Canada comparable to those delivered by First Student in the United States. The component parts of the operation consist of the former Laidlaw services and subsequent new acquisitions by First Canada.

Operating subsidiaries

Laidlaw
Laidlaw Transit Ltd., is a Canadian registered subsidiary which operates former Laidlaw school transportation services throughout Southern Ontario.

Farwest Group
The Farwest Group of companies provides transportation services in various communities in British Columbia. These companies were acquired by First Canada in 2004 and are contracted to operate public transit services for BC Transit in Chilliwack, Kamloops, Kelowna Region and the Central Fraser Valley.

Cardinal
Several companies branded as "Cardinal" operated school buses in different locations across Canada. In 2005, Firstbus Canada acquired 471136 B.C. Limited and Cardinal Transportation B.C. Inc., Vancouver, British Columbia and Cardinal Coach Lines Limited and Focus Capital Inc., Calgary, Alberta and Cardinal Coach Lines (Ont.) Ltd., North York, Ontario.

King Transportation
King Transportation Ltd., is a Winnipeg based company that provides school bus transportation, special education transportation services, charter and maintenance services. The company was acquired by FirstBus Canada in 2008.

2014 Calgary controversy
In February 2014, the company was subject to criticism after it fired Kendra Lindon, a school bus driver after she used her own vehicle to pick up children from her route after her bus failed to start. Due to the extremely low temperature (-26 degrees Celsius), and due to the failure of her dispatch to send replacement buses on the previous day, Lindon decided that "it wouldn’t be right" to leave children out in the cold and feared they might suffer frostbite, since many were not properly dressed for such cold weather. Upon learning of Lindon's actions, the company immediately terminated her employment, on the grounds that it was "against company policy to pick up children in a personal vehicle." Lindon defended her decision, stating that "I was not acting as a bus driver at that point, but as a concerned parent...I saw these kids I’ve known since they were five. I was acting as a parent and a concerned neighbor and friend. I couldn’t just drive past them and leave them to freeze."

When contacted by Licia Corbella of Postmedia News, the assistant location and safety manager, Mike Stiles, declined to comment and referred her to the First Student's Cincinnati headquarters, which did not return any calls for inquiry. Three lawyers, who have offered to represent Ms. Lindon pro bono, have suggested that she may have a case against First Student for wrongful dismissal.

References

External links

Official website

Companies based in Cincinnati
FirstGroup companies
School bus operators
Student transport
Transport companies established in 1999
1999 establishments in Ohio